All About Us is an American teen sitcom series that aired on NBC during the station's TNBC lineup from August 4, 2001 to November 10, 2001. It was produced by Peter Engel Productions. The series' premiere episode was directed by Fred Savage. The show was canceled after one season when NBC decided to abandon its TNBC lineup and instead lease its Saturday mornings to Discovery Networks starting in fall 2002.

Synopsis
The series focuses on the development of four teenage girls who live and attend high school in Chicago. In the show, the girls' divergent talents, perspectives, and family experiences become the platform for illustrating alternative approaches to understanding and solving problems. It was the first TNBC series shot on videotape that did not have the use of laugh track.

Cast
 Alecia Elliott as Alecia Alcott
 Marieh Delfino as Niki Merrick
 Crystal Grant as Sierra Jennings
 Alicia Lagano as Cristina Castelli

Episodes

References

External links
 

2001 American television series debuts
2001 American television series endings
2000s American comedy-drama television series
2000s American high school television series
2000s American teen drama television series
2000s American teen sitcoms
English-language television shows
NBC original programming
Television shows set in Chicago
TNBC
Television series about teenagers
Television series by Universal Television